Elachista sincera is a moth of the family Elachistidae. It is found in Utah, United States.

References

Moths described in 1925
sincera
Moths of North America